Northwest Branch may refer to:

Northwest Branch Anacostia River, in Maryland
Northwest Branch Saint John River, in Maine